Teresa Frassinetti (born 24 December 1985) is an Italian former water polo player, who is currently deputy president of the Federazione Italiana Nuoto.

She was part of the Italian team winning the bronze medal at the 2015 World Aquatics Championships, where she played in the centre forward position.
She competed in the 2012 Summer Olympics, and the 2016 Summer Olympics.

On 19 May 2017 Frassinetti announced her retirement from the game.

See also
 Italy women's Olympic water polo team records and statistics
 List of Olympic medalists in water polo (women)
 List of players who have appeared in multiple women's Olympic water polo tournaments
 List of World Aquatics Championships medalists in water polo

References

External links
 

1985 births
Living people
Water polo players from Genoa
Italian female water polo players
Water polo centre forwards
Water polo players at the 2008 Summer Olympics
Water polo players at the 2012 Summer Olympics
Water polo players at the 2016 Summer Olympics
Medalists at the 2016 Summer Olympics
Olympic silver medalists for Italy in water polo
World Aquatics Championships medalists in water polo
21st-century Italian women